Home computers were a class of microcomputer that existed from 1977 to about 1995. During this time it made economic sense for manufacturers to make microcomputers aimed at the home user. By simplifying the machines, and making use of household items such as television sets and cassette recorders instead of dedicated computer peripherals, the home computer allowed the consumer to own a computer at a fraction of the price of computers oriented to small business. Today, the price of microcomputers has dropped to the point where there's no advantage to building a separate, incompatible series just for home users.

While many office-type personal computers were used in homes, in this list a "home computer" is a factory-assembled mass-marketed consumer product, usually at significantly lower cost than contemporary business computers. It would have an alphabetic keyboard and a multi-line alphanumeric display, the ability to run both games software as well as application software and user-written programs, and some removable mass storage device (such as cassette tape or floppy disk).

This list excludes smartphones, personal digital assistants, pocket computers, laptop computers, programmable calculators and pure video game consoles. Single-board development or evaluation boards, intended to demonstrate a microprocessor, are excluded since these were not marketed to general consumers.

Pioneering kit and assembled hobby microcomputers which generally required electronics skills to build or operate are listed separately, as are computers intended primarily for use in schools. A hobby-type computer often would have required significant expansion of memory and peripherals to make it useful for the usual role of a factory-made home computer. School computers usually had facilities to share expensive peripherals such as disk drives and printers, and often had provision for central administration.

Attributes
Attributes are as typically advertised by the original manufacturer. Popular machines inspired third-party sources for adapters, add-on processors, mass storage, and other peripherals.

"Processor" indicates the microprocessor chip that ran the system. A few home computers had multiple processors, generally used for input/output devices. Processor speeds were not a competitive point among home computer manufacturers, and typically the processor ran either at its maximum rated speed ( between 1 and 4 MHz for most processor types here), or at some fraction of the television color subcarrier signal, for economy of design. Since a crystal oscillator was necessary for stable color, it was often also used as the microprocessor clock source. Many processors were second-sourced, with different manufacturers making the same device under different part numbers. Variations of a basic part number might have been used to indicate minor variations in speed or transistor type, or might indicate fairly significant alterations to the prototype's capabilities.  In the Eastern Bloc countries, manufacturers made functional duplicates of  Western microprocessors under different part number series.

TV indicates the factory configuration produces composite video compatible with a home TV receiver. Some computers came with a built-in RF modulator to allow connection to the TV receiver antenna terminals; others output composite video for use with a free-standing monitor or external RF modulator. Still others had built-in or proprietary monitors. Often a composite video monitor (monochrome or color) would be substituted for the family TV.  Some standard types of video controller ICs were popular, but see the very detailed List of home computers by video hardware for a discussion of video capabilities of different models. Memory and TV bandwidth restrictions meant that typical home computers had only a few color choices and perhaps 20 lines of 40 characters of text as an upper limit to their video capabilities. Where the same model was sold in countries using PAL or NTSC television standards, sometimes there would be minor variations in the speed of the processor, because NTSC and PAL use different frequencies for the color information and the crystal for the video system was often also used for the processor clock.

Base mass storage was whatever came in the basic configuration. Some machines had built-in cassette drives or optional external drives, others relied on the consumer to provide a cassette recorder. Cassette recorders had the primary virtue of being widely available as a consumer product at the time. Typically a home computer would generate audio tones to encode data, that could be stored on audio tape through a direct connection to the recorder.  Re-loading the data required re-winding the tape. The home computer would contain some circuit such as a phase-locked loop to convert audio tones back into digital data.  Since consumer cassette recorders were not made for remote control, the user would have to manually operate the recorder in response to prompts from the computer.  Random access to data on a cassette was impossible, since the entire tape would have to be searched to retrieve any particular item. A few manufacturers integrated a cassette tape drive or cassette-like tape mechanism into the console, but these variants were made obsolete by the reduction in cost of floppy diskette drives.

Floppy disk drives were initially very costly compared to the system purchase price.  Plug-in ROM cartridges containing game or application software were popular in earlier home computers since they were easier to use, faster, and more reliable than cassette tapes. Once diskette drives became available at low cost, cartridges declined in popularity since they were more expensive to manufacture than reproducing a diskette, and had comparatively small capacity compared to diskettes.  A few cartridges contained battery-backed memory that allowed users to save data (for example, game high scores) between uses of the cartridge.

Typically there were several models or variants within a product line, especially to account for different international video standards and power supplies; see the linked articles for variants and consequences of variations. "Compatibility" indicates some measure of compatibility with a parent type, however, sometimes incompatibility existed even within a product family. A "clone" system has identical hardware and is functionally interchangeable with its prototype; a few clone systems relied on illicit copies of system ROMs to make them functional.

Manufacturers and models

List of hobby, kit, or trainer computers

This type of microcomputer required significant electronics skills to assemble or operate. They were sometimes sold in kit form that required the user to insert and solder components in a printed circuit board. They may have had just blinking lights and toggle switches, or a hexadecimal display and a numeric keypad. While some units were possibly expandable to the "checkbook balancing/homework typing" stage, most were intended more for education on the use and application of microprocessors. See also Microprocessor development board, Single-board computer.

 Altair 8800
 Apple I and also Replica 1
 Applix 1616
 Compukit UK101
 Dick Smith Super-80 Computer
 Educ-8 non-microprocessor kit computer
 Elektor Junior Computer
 Elektor TV Games Computer
 Ferguson Big Board
 Galaksija, a build-it-yourself home computer that created a wave of enthusiasts
 Heathkit H8 and relations
 Heathkit H11
 Heath ET-100 8088 trainer
 Kenbak-1
 KIM-1
 LNW-80
 MK14
 Mark-8
 Micro-Professor MPF-I
 Nascom 1 and Nascom 2
 Newbear 77-68
 Processor Technology SOL 20
 PSI Comp 80 (computer)
 SCELBI
 Sinclair ZX80 kit
 Tangerine MICROTAN 65
 TEC-1
 Wave Mate Bullet
 Z 1013

School computers
These were aimed at the class room, not the living room. Some types were popular in the centrally planned economies of eastern Europe where Western computers were scarce, or in the early days of computer education in Western schools. Popular home computers of the period were fitted with various types of network interfaces to allow sharing of files, large disk drives, and printers, and often allowed a teacher to interact with a student, supervise the system usage, and carry out administrative tasks from a host computer.

Acorn Archimedes (and derivatives)
Aster CT-80
BBC Micro
Commodore SuperPET/SP9000
Compis
IQ 151
LINK 480Z
Regency Systems R2C
Research Machines 380Z Industrial and school systems
Tiki 100
TIM-011
Unisys ICON

Cardboard  and demonstrator "computers"
Logic demonstrators illustrated some of the logical principles of computer circuits, but were incapable of automatic operation or non-trivial calculations. Some were literally cardboard, others used combinations of switches and lamps to show how logical operations worked. Some products demonstrated logical operations purely mechanically.

 CARDboard Illustrative Aid to Computation cardboard computer logic demonstrator
 Digi-Comp I, mechanical logic demonstrator
 Digi-Comp II, mechanical logic using marbles
 Geniac, non-electronic logic demonstrator
 Minivac 601, logic trainer that demonstrated computer circuits

See also

 History of computer hardware in Eastern Bloc countries
 Homebrew Computer Club
 Homebuilt computer
 List of home computers by video hardware classified by video interface
 List of computers running CP/M contains a list of personal computers running CP/M.  These were usually intended for small office use.
 List of Soviet computer systems includes many "home" systems as well as office and "big iron" systems.
 Market share of personal computer vendors
 Popular Electronics
 Simon (computer), a relay computer (demonstrator) from 1950
 SWTPC
 TV Typewriter

References

External links

Obsolete technology website — Information about many old computers.
old-computers.com — Web Site dedicated to old computers.
oldcomputer.info — Web site with information about many old computers.
History of Computers — online magazine featuring pictures and information about many computers made between the 1970s and the early 1990s
epocalc The complete inventory of microcomputer manufacturers

List of home computers
Home computers